Wurdi Youang is the name attributed to an Aboriginal stone arrangement located off the Little River – Ripley Road at Mount Rothwell, near Little River, Victoria in Australia. The site was acquired by the Indigenous Land Corporation on 14 January 2000 and transferred to the Wathaurong Aboriginal Co-operative on 17 August 2006.

Description
There are three prominent waist-high stones, at its western end, which is the highest point of the ring. The purpose, use, and age of the arrangement are not known. The purpose of the site may be ceremonial in nature as with many other stone arrangements in southeastern Australia.

The site is recorded on the Victorian Aboriginal Heritage Register, the Victorian Heritage Register (H1107), and the City of Greater Geelong Planning Scheme Heritage Overlay (HO294).

The name Wurdi Youang is a Wada-wurrung name meaning "big hill", which is the original name of what is now called Station peak or Flinders Peak - the tallest of the You Yangs. During the late 19th and early 20th century, the region between the You Yangs, the town of Little River, and the Little River itself were known as the Parish of Wurdi Youang in the County of Grant. The site is registered in Victoria under the name "Mount Rothwell Stone Arrangement".

Astronomical hypothesis

A series of stones, located to the west of the arrangement's western apex, mark the positions of the setting sun at the equinoxes and solstices. A survey study shows that these alignments are accurate to within a few degrees.  Additionally, the straight sides of the arrangement, which diverge from its eastern apex, also indicate the setting position of the sun at the solstices to within a few degrees and at the equinoxes the sun sets over the three prominent stones at the apex.

It has been suggested by scientists studying the arrangements that it could be as old as 11,000 years (based on carbon dating at nearby sites), which could make it the oldest astronomical observatory in the world. However, the age of the arrangement is not known.

References

Further reading
 Mountford, C.P. (1927). "Aboriginal stone structures in South Australia", Transactions and Proceedings of the Royal Society of South Australia 51, 169–172.
 Mountford, C.P. (1976). Nomads of the Australian Desert. Adelaide: Rigby.
 Threadgold, H 2018, What The Stones Tell Us? Aboriginal Stone Sites, Indigenous Landscapes and Country’s in the Face of Urban Sprawl, accessed <https://apo.org.au/sites/default/files/resource-files/2018-06/apo-nid212851.pdf>

Stone circles in Australia